The 1st National People's Congress was in session from 1954 to 1959. It held four sessions in this period. There were 1226 deputies to the Congress. These were the first legislative elections to take place after the founding of the People's Republic of China.

Elections to the Congress 
In accordance with the rules set by the 1st Chinese People's Political Consultative Conference, the first set of deputies to the NPC were elected in the spring and summer of 1954, the first elections under the 1953 Electoral Law which set rules for elections in the PRC, by the following:

 Provincial legislatures
 Legislative councils of the directly administered cities
 Regional legislature of Inner Mongolia

First Plenary Session 

The first plenary session was held in September 1954. The Congress passed the 1954 Constitution of the People's Republic of China. It elected the state leaders:

Chairman of the People's Republic of China: Mao Zedong
Vice Chairman of the People's Republic of China: Zhu De
Chairman of the Standing Committee of the National People's Congress: Liu Shaoqi
Premier of the State Council: Zhou Enlai
President of the Supreme People's Court: Dong Biwu
Procurator-General of the Supreme People's Procuratorate: Zhang Dingcheng

References

External links 
  Official website of the NPC

National People's Congresses
1954 establishments in China